Oakland Coliseum, currently branded as RingCentral Coliseum, is a stadium in Oakland, California. It is part of the Oakland–Alameda County Coliseum Complex, with the adjacent Oakland Arena, near Interstate 880. The Coliseum is the home ballpark of the Oakland Athletics of Major League Baseball. In 2017, the playing surface was dedicated as Rickey Henderson Field in honor of Major League Baseball Hall of Famer and former Athletics left fielder Rickey Henderson.

As a multi-purpose stadium, it was the former home of the Oakland Raiders of the National Football League from 1966 until 1981 (when the team moved to Los Angeles), and again from 1995 until 2019 (when the team moved to Las Vegas). Since then, the stadium has been primarily used for baseball. It was the last remaining stadium in the United States shared by professional baseball and football teams. It has also occasionally been used for soccer, including hosting selected San Jose Earthquakes matches in 2008 and 2009, and during the 2009 CONCACAF Gold Cup.

The Coliseum has a seating capacity of up to 63,132 depending on its configuration; an upper deck dubbed "Mount Davis" by fans was added as part of a 1996 renovation for the Raiders' return to Oakland. In 2006, citing a desire to provide a more "intimate" environment, the Athletics blocked off the entirety of the Coliseum's third deck during its games, which artificially limited its capacity to 34,077 (making it the smallest stadium in Major League Baseball). On April 11, 2017, with Dave Kaval as the then-new team president, the Athletics began to reopen some of the sections in the third deck, and open the Mount Davis deck for selected marquee games; this configuration makes it, by contrast, the largest baseball stadium in the United States by capacity.

Stadium history

Planning and construction
Business and political leaders in Oakland had long been in competition with neighboring San Francisco, as well as other cities in the West, and worked for Oakland and its greater East Bay suburbs to be recognized nationally as a viable metropolitan area with its own identity and reputation, distinct and separate from that of San Francisco. Professional sports was seen as a primary way for the East Bay to gain such recognition. As a result, the desire for a major league stadium in the city of Oakland intensified during the 1950s and 1960s.

By 1960, a non-profit corporation was formed to oversee the financing and development of the facility rather than city or county government issuing taxpayer-backed bonds for construction. Local real estate developer Robert T. Nahas (who had been president of Oakland's chamber of commerce) headed this group, which included other prominent East Bay business leaders such as former US Senator William Knowland and Edgar F. Kaiser, and which later became the governing board of the Coliseum upon completion. It was Nahas' idea that the Coliseum be privately financed with ownership transferring to the city and county upon retirement of the construction financing.

Nahas served 20 years as President of the Oakland–Alameda County Coliseum Board. On the death of Nahas, Jack Maltester, a former San Leandro mayor and Coliseum board member, said, "If not for Bob Nahas, there would be no Coliseum, it's really that simple." Nahas had to be a diplomat dealing with the egos of Raiders owner Al Davis, Athletics owner Charles O. Finley, and Warriors owner Franklin Mieuli.

Preliminary architectural plans were unveiled in November 1960, and the following month a site was chosen west of the Elmhurst district of East Oakland alongside the recently completed Nimitz Freeway. A downtown site adjacent to Lake Merritt and the Oakland Auditorium was also originally considered. The Port of Oakland played a key role in selection of the East Oakland site. The Port then donated that land to the City of Oakland as the site for the complex.

The Oakland Raiders of the American Football League moved to Frank Youell Field, a makeshift stadium near downtown Oakland, in 1962, and the Coliseum was already being heralded in the local media as the Raiders' future permanent home. Baseball was also a major factor in the planning of the Coliseum. As early as 1961, the American League publicly indicated that it wished to include Oakland in its West Coast expansion plans. In 1963, American League president Joe Cronin suggested that Coliseum officials model some aspects of the new ballpark after Dodger Stadium, which impressed him, though these expansion plans seemed to fade by the middle of the decade.

After approval from the city of Oakland as well as Alameda County by 1962, $25 million in financing was arranged. Plans were drawn for a stadium, an indoor arena, and an exhibition hall in between them. The architect of record was the San Francisco office of Skidmore, Owings & Merrill with Myron Goldsmith the principal design architect and the general contractor was Guy F. Atkinson Company. Preliminary site preparation began in the summer of 1961. Construction began in the spring of 1962. The construction schedule was delayed for two years due to various legal issues and cost overruns; the original design had to be modified slightly to stay within budget.

In 1965, it was rumored that the Cleveland Indians might leave Cleveland for a West Coast city (such as Oakland), but the Indians stayed in Cleveland. Charlie Finley, owner of the Kansas City Athletics, unhappy in Kansas City, was impressed by Oakland's new stadium and personally convinced to consider Oakland by Nahas. After several unsuccessful attempts and amid considerable controversy, Finley eventually got permission to relocate the Athletics to Oakland in 1968. One year later, the A's replacement, the Kansas City Royals, began play as an expansion team.

Stadium name changes

For over three decades (1966–1998), the stadium was first known as Oakland–Alameda County Coliseum.

In September 1997, UMAX Technologies agreed to acquire the naming rights to the stadium. However, following a dispute, a court decision reinstated the Oakland–Alameda County Coliseum name. In 1998, Network Associates agreed to pay US$5.8 million over five years for the naming rights and the stadium became known as Network Associates Coliseum, or, alternately in marketing and media usage as, "the Net".

Network Associates renewed the contract in 2003 for an additional five years at a cost of $6 million. In mid-2004, Network Associates was renamed McAfee, restoring its name from before its 1997 merger with Network General, and the stadium was renamed McAfee Coliseum accordingly.

McAfee was offered a renewal of the naming contract in 2008, but it was declined. The name reverted to the pre-1997 name of Oakland–Alameda County Coliseum on September 19, 2008. The stadium retained its original name until April 27, 2011, when it was renamed Overstock.com Coliseum via a six-year, $7.2 million naming rights deal with online retailer Overstock.com.

The Coliseum was renamed O.co Coliseum on June 6, 2011, after Overstock.com's marketing name. However, due to a contract dispute with the Athletics regarding the Overstock/O.co naming rights deal, the A's continued to refer to the stadium as the Oakland–Alameda County Coliseum in all official team communications and on team websites.

Overstock opted out of the final year on their naming rights deal on April 2, 2016, and the stadium once again became the Oakland–Alameda County Coliseum.

The Athletics dedicated the Coliseum's playing surface "Rickey Henderson Field" in honor of MLB Hall of Famer and former Athletic Rickey Henderson as part of Opening Day on April 3, 2017.

RingCentral placed a bid for the naming rights on May 14, 2019, for a $1 million annual payment. The Oakland–Alameda County Coliseum Authority gave its approval of the new naming-rights deal on May 31, 2019 pending formal approval from Major League Baseball. New signage was in place by the time that the Golden State Warriors hosted the 2019 NBA Finals at the neighboring Oracle Arena on June 5.

In August 2019, the head of the Coliseum Authority, Scott McKibben, abruptly resigned his position after allegations emerged that he had requested a $50,000 fee from RingCentral in exchange for negotiating the naming rights deal. McKibben was subsequently charged by the Alameda County district attorney's office with violating conflict-of-interest laws, including one felony and one misdemeanor count. On January 17, 2020, the RingCentral naming rights deal was rescinded by the Coliseum Authority. In late 2020, a new three year naming rights deal with RingCentral was agreed to.

Design

Consequently, fans entering the stadium find themselves walking on to the main concourse of the stadium at the top of the first level of seats. This, combined with the hill that was built around the stadium to create the upper concourse, means that only the third deck is visible from outside the park.

Configurations

In its baseball configuration, the Coliseum has the most foul territory of any ballpark in Major League Baseball. Thus, many balls that would reach the seats in other ballparks can be caught for outs at the Coliseum.

From 1968 through 1981 and in 1995, two football configurations were used at the stadium. During Raider preseason games and all regular season games played while the baseball season was still going on, the field was set up from home plate to center field (east/west). Once the A's season ended, the orientation was switched to north/south: i.e. the football field ran from the left field line to the right field line; seats were moved from behind first and third base to create corners for the end zone to fit into (these seats were then placed to fill in the space that was normally behind home plate and near the foul poles for baseball games). Temporary football bleachers were then added in front of the baseball bleachers to form the sideline on the east (visitors') side, and the baseball bleachers were not sold. Raiders season ticket holders would thus have two season ticket locations in different parts of the stadium that roughly corresponded to the same location in relation to the field. After stadium expansion in 1996, the field ran north/south throughout the season.

Seating capacity

Eventual replacements

Athletics 

Athletics owner Lewis Wolff made the first official proposal for a new ballpark in Oakland to the Oakland-Alameda County Coliseum Authority on August 12, 2005. The new stadium would have been located across 66th Avenue from the Coliseum in what is currently an industrial area north of the Coliseum. The park would have held 35,000 fans, making it the smallest park in the major leagues. Plans for the Oakland location fell through in early 2006 when several of the owners of the land proposed for the new ballpark decided not to sell.

Throughout 2006, the Athletics continued to search for a ballpark site within their designated territory of Alameda County. Late in 2006, rumors began to circulate regarding a  parcel of land in Fremont being the new site. These rumors were confirmed by the Fremont city council on November8 of that year. Wolff met with the council that day to present his plan to move the A's to Fremont into a soon to be built ballpark named Cisco Field. Wolff and Cisco Systems conducted a press conference at the San Jose-based headquarters of Cisco Systems on November 14, 2006 to confirm the deal, and showcase some details of the future plan. However, on February 24, 2009, after delays and increased public opposition, the Athletics officially ended their search for a stadium site in Fremont. The Athletics later took their Cisco Field plan to a site in downtown San Jose located near SAP Center (home of the NHL's San Jose Sharks). The San Jose plan was opposed by the San Francisco Giants whose territory San Jose is in and on October 5, 2015, the United States Supreme Court rejected San Jose's bid on the Athletics.

During that time, the City of Oakland continued to propose new ballpark ideas that ranged from a proposal to build on a waterfront site in the Jack London Square area called Victory Court to a three stadium proposal called Coliseum City on the Coliseum site. Both plans went nowhere.

The Athletics signed a ten-year lease to stay in Oakland and at the Coliseum on July 22, 2014. The deal required that the team look into a new stadium, but only in the city limits, which made it more difficult for the Raiders to tear the Coliseum down for a football-only facility. The A's began talks with an architect on August 6, 2014, to build a baseball-only stadium at the Coliseum site, according to Wolff.

Going into 2016, John J. Fisher took majority control of the team and made Dave Kaval team president and the person in charge of the stadium hunt. On September 12, 2017, it was announced that a site near Laney College and the Eastlake neighborhood had been chosen for the new ballpark (tentatively called Oakland Ballpark) with the A's proposing to construct a 35,000 seat stadium on the site of the college's administrative buildings which the A's would relocate to a spot of the college's choosing. However, the Laney College Board of Trustees abruptly ended talks with the Athletics in December 2017. The surprised A's were forced to look at alternatives for a new stadium location.

On November 28, 2018, the Athletics announced that the team had chosen to build its 34,000-seat new ballpark at the Howard Terminal site, located about two miles west of Laney College at the Port of Oakland. The team also announced its intent to purchase the Coliseum site and make that into a technology and housing hub, preserving Oracle Arena and reducing the Coliseum to a low-rise sports park as San Francisco did with Kezar Stadium.

A turning point came in spring of 2021, when Commissioner Rob Manfred suggested that the A's look into relocation to another city after the Howard Terminal plans stalled. However, the A's said that they remain committed to staying in Oakland, and will continue their efforts to get the new ballpark at Howard Terminal built. At the same time, the team has eyed a possible move to Las Vegas if they can't get a new ballpark built at Howard Terminal with team representatives, Kaval and Fisher organizing multiple trips to the area to speak with local officials and business magnates and selecting the Tropicana Las Vegas hotel and resort as the site for a new venue should they relocate. The team previously played six games at Las Vegas' Cashman Field when renovations for the Coliseum were not yet complete.

Athletics Coliseum redevelopment plan 
The Coliseum, along with Oracle Arena and its surrounding parking lots, are owned 50% by the City of Oakland and 50% by the Athletics. The Athletics purchased their 50% share in 2018 from Alameda County, after the City of Oakland dropped a lawsuit that attempted to block the sale. As of July 2021, two Black-led redevelopment groups were vying for the chance to purchase the City's half of the site, one led by the African American Sports and Entertainment Group and the other by Dave Stewart and Lonnie Murray. In November 2021, the council voted to move forward with the plan proposed by the African American Sports and Entertainment Group.

Raiders 

Under any such replacement proposals, the Oakland Raiders would have presumably continued to play football in the Coliseum, although there were proposals for the Raiders to play at Levi's Stadium, the home of the San Francisco 49ers in Santa Clara as well as rumors regarding the Raiders' possible return to Los Angeles.

The Raiders proposed a 50,000-seat stadium in the same spot of the Coliseum in 2013. It would have cost $800 million, with $300 million coming from the Raiders, $200 million coming from the NFL's stadium loan program, and the final $300 million coming from the city. After the failure of the stadium plan, Raiders owner Mark Davis met with officials with the city of San Antonio on July 29, 2014, to discuss moving the Raiders to the city in time for the 2015 season; they would have temporarily played home games at the Alamodome until a new permanent stadium was built.

On September 3, 2014, the city of Oakland claimed it had reached a tentative deal to build a new football stadium in Oakland, which would have resulted in the Coliseum being demolished. The claim was met with silence from the Raiders, who continued to explore San Antonio, and opposition from Alameda County.

On February 19, 2015, the Raiders and the San Diego Chargers announced plans for a privately financed $1.7 billion stadium that the two teams would have built in Carson upon being approved to move to the Los Angeles market. Both teams said they would continue to attempt to get stadiums built in their respective cities. The stadium was approved by the Carson City Council but was defeated by the NFL who voted in favor of building Inglewood's SoFi Stadium and relocating the St. Louis Rams back to Los Angeles with the Chargers as the second LA team thus shutting out the Raiders from the Southern California market.

In January 2016, Mark Davis met with Las Vegas Sands owner Sheldon Adelson about building a domed stadium on the UNLV campus for the Raiders and the UNLV Rebels. The stadium location for what became known as Allegiant Stadium was later moved to a site across Interstate 15 from Mandalay Bay. After the approval of $750 million from the state of Nevada and backing from Bank of America after Adelson pulled out of the project, the Raiders submitted papers for relocation to Las Vegas in January 2017, and on March 27, the Raiders' relocation to Las Vegas was approved.  The team planned to continue to play at the Coliseum through the 2019 NFL season and relocate to Las Vegas in 2020. In December 2018, the city of Oakland sued the Raiders and all the other NFL teams for millions in unpaid debts and financial damages, which prompted Raiders management to declare that the team was leaving after the 2018 season. After the 49ers blocked an attempt by the Raiders to relocate to Oracle Park for the 2019 season, the Raiders and Coliseum Authority reached an agreement in principle on February 25, 2019 to allow the Raiders to return to the Coliseum for 2019 with a provision for 2020 in case completion of Allegiant Stadium was delayed; the Coliseum Authority approved the lease on March 15 while the Alameda County Board of Supervisors and Oakland City Council voted in favor of the lease on March 19 and 21, respectively. On January 22, 2020, the Raiders officially moved to Las Vegas becoming the Las Vegas Raiders.

Notable events

Raiders and A's move in 
The Raiders played their first game at the stadium on September 18, 1966. In 1968, the Kansas City Athletics moved to Oakland and began play at the stadium. The Athletics' first game was played on April 17, 1968. On April 17, 1968, Boog Powell hit the first major league home run in the history of the Coliseum. On May8 of that year, Catfish Hunter pitched the ninth perfect game in Major League history at the Coliseum. The Coliseum hosted the 1967 and 1969 AFL championship games. Additionally, the venue had hosted the second match of the NPSL Final 1967.

1970s

From 1970 to 1972 the stadium hosted three college football benefit games featuring Bay Area schools versus historically black colleges.

The Coliseum hosted the 1971 East–West Shrine Game on January 2, 1971. In 1972, the Athletics won their first of three straight World Series championships and their first since their years in Philadelphia.

The awkwardness of the baseball–football conversion, as well as the low seating capacity (around 54,000 for football) and that the prime seating on the east side consisted of temporary bleachers led the Raiders to explore other stadium options. One such option was Memorial Stadium on the UC Berkeley campus. Several preseason games were played there in the early 1970s along with one regular season game in 1973 (a 12–7 victory over the Miami Dolphins during September while the A's regular season was going on). However, in response to traffic and parking issues associated with these games (while Cal games drew a large number of students who live on or near campus and walk to the games, Raiders games attracted fans from a larger geographic area who were used to tailgating at the Coliseum and were more likely to drive to games), the City of Berkeley passed a Professional Sports Events License Tax in which the city collected 10% of all gate receipts, making the staging of professional games inside the city cost-prohibitive. The Raiders were granted an injunction from the city collecting the tax, arguing that the tax was a regulatory measure rather than a revenue measure, and was therefore an improper regulation on land held in trust by the Regents of the University of California. However, the grant of the injunction was reversed by the California Court of Appeals, who found it to be a revenue measure, despite the fact that the city had made the measure immediately effective "due to danger to the public peace, health, and safety of the City of Berkeley as a result of the holding of professional sports events there".

The stadium was not well maintained for most of the late 1970s. Its condition was most noticeable during baseball season, when crowds for A's games twice numbered fewer than 1,000. On April 17, 1979, only 653 fans attended the game versus the Seattle Mariners. During this time, it was popularly known as the "Oakland Mausoleum".

1980s

In 1980, the Raiders won Super Bowl XV. Two years later, the Raiders moved to Los Angeles, leaving the A's as the only remaining tenants of Oakland Coliseum. Only days later, Finley agreed to sell the A's to Marvin Davis, who planned to move the A's to Denver. However, city and county officials were not about to lose Oakland's status as a major league city in its own right, and refused to let the A's out of their lease. Finley sold the team instead to the owners of San Francisco-based Levi Strauss & Co. After the 1986 Major League Baseball season, the original scoreboards were replaced. A new American Sign and Indicator scoreboard and message center was installed behind the left field bleachers, while the original right field scoreboard was replaced with a manually operated out-of-town scoreboard. Between the centerfield flagpoles, a new Diamond Vision video screen was installed.

The 1987 Major League Baseball All-Star Game was held at the stadium. From 1988 to 1990, the venue saw three more World Series. In 1989, the Athletics won their 4th Series since moving to Oakland, sweeping the San Francisco Giants in the earthquake-interrupted "Battle of the Bay" Series.

1990s
In July 1995, the Raiders agreed to return to Oakland provided that Oakland Coliseum underwent renovations. In November 1995, those renovations commenced and continued through the next summer until the beginning of the 1996 football season (more info below). The new layout also had the somewhat peculiar effect of creating an inward jog in the outfield fence, in left center and right center. There are now three distance markers instead of one, at various points of the power alleys, as indicated in the dimensions grid. The Raiders' return also heralded the creation of the "Black Hole", a highly recognizable group of fans who occupied one end zone seating during football games.

2000s
On April 2, 2006, the broadcast booth was renamed in honor of the late Bill King, a legendary Bay Area sportscaster who was the play-by-play voice of the A's, Raiders and Warriors for 44 years.

San Jose Earthquakes of Major League Soccer, announced in November 2007 that they would be playing their "big draw" games, such as those featuring David Beckham and the Los Angeles Galaxy, at the stadium instead of their then-home Buck Shaw Stadium (capacity roughly 10,000) in Santa Clara. Since then the Quakes moved to their new home of Avaya Stadium and play their bigger games in nearby Stanford Stadium.

Midway through the decade, the stadium established a "no re-entry" policy. Each ticket can be used only once, after which a second ticket must be purchased in order to re-enter the Coliseum.

2010s
On May 9, 2010, almost 42 years to the day of Catfish Hunter's perfect game, Dallas Braden pitched the 19th perfect game in Major League history at the Coliseum. A commemorative graphic was placed on the baseball outfield wall next to Rickey Henderson's retired number on May 17, their next home game.

With the Miami Marlins opening their own ballpark in 2012, the stadium became the last remaining venue in the United States that hosted both a Major League Baseball and a National Football League team.

As part of a new ten-year lease signed by the Athletics with the Oakland–Alameda County Coliseum Authority in 2014, the Oakland Coliseum had a new $10 million scoreboard system (two large outfield scoreboards, 36 feet tall and 145 feet wide, and two ribbon scoreboards) installed for the start of the 2015 MLB season. Also part of the new lease, the Coliseum Authority agreed to pay $1million a year, with five percent annual increases, into a fund to maintain the stadium.

For the 2017 Major League Baseball season, the tarp covering a large amount of the baseball configuration has been removed, increasing the capacity to over 47,000 for the first time since 1995. The tarp remains on the football-only Mt. Davis.

From 2016 onward, the A's have invested heavily in improvements to the Coliseum. In 2017 the team created a new outdoor plaza area with food trucks and lawn games, called Championship Plaza. The West Side Club was also entirely renovated and rebranded into Shibe Park Tavern (after their former home park in Philadelphia), the Coliseum's new destination restaurant and bar with more than twenty different beers on tap. In 2018, the A's created a brand new destination indoor/outdoor bar concept in the left field corner called The Treehouse. The Treehouse has brought a new demographic of fans to the Coliseum through nightly themed discounts and through its innovative subscription ticketing product, the Treehouse Pass.

On April 17, 2018, the Athletics opened the gates to the Coliseum for a free admission game versus the Chicago White Sox. It was the 50th anniversary of the club's first game played in Oakland back on April 17, 1968. 46,028 fans were on hand for the 10–2 Athletics victory and Kaval called the game "a gift to Oakland".

On December 15, 2019, the Raiders played their last scheduled game at the Coliseum, losing to the Jacksonville Jaguars by a score of 20–16, giving up 17 unanswered points in the second half. Fans booed the team as they exited the field for the last time.

2020s 
On September 6, 2020, the San Diego Padres and the Athletics played in the warmest game in the Coliseum's history. The game was played in 94-degree heat.

Concerts
Commencing in 1973, the stadium hosted an annual Day on the Green concert series, presented by Bill Graham and his company Bill Graham Presents, which continued on into the early 1990s.

In January 1974, singer Marvin Gaye used the stadium as the site for his comeback to the performance stage. His acclaimed performance was later released for the live album, Marvin Gaye Live!.

Led Zeppelin played what turned out to be their final North American concerts with twin shows during their 1977 North American Tour. Following the second show Bill Graham barred the band from the venue and his other managed venues in response to the band's manager Peter Grant, drummer John Bonham and security 'co-ordinator' John Bindon's brutal assault on one of Graham's security employees during the first show, following the employee's refusal to allow Grant's 11-year-old son Warren to take an item belonging to the venue as memorabilia.  The death of Plant's young son Karac three days later and the resulting cancellation of the remaining tour dates rendered Graham's action academic.

Parliament-Funkadelic brought the P-Funk Earth Tour to the Coliseum on January 21, 1977. Their performance was recorded and released as a double LP set entitled Live: P-Funk Earth Tour.

The stadium played host to Amnesty International's Human Rights Now! Benefit Concert on September 23, 1988. The show was headlined by Sting and Peter Gabriel and also featured Bruce Springsteen & The E Street Band, Tracy Chapman, Youssou N'Dour, Roy Orbison and Joan Baez.

Metallica and Guns N' Roses brought the Guns N' Roses/Metallica Stadium Tour to the Coliseum on September 24, 1992, with Body Count as their opening act.

U2 played 2 nights in June 1997 at the Oakland Coliseum as part of their PopMart tour. They were supported by Oasis, one of the first shows of their Be Here Now tour.

The stadium played host to The Gigantour on September 8, 2006, featuring performances by Megadeth, Lamb of God, Opeth, Arch Enemy, Overkill, Into Eternity, Sanctity and The SmashUp.

U2 performed at the stadium again during their 360° Tour on June 7, 2011, with Lenny Kravitz and Moonalice as their opening acts in front of 64,829 people. The show was originally scheduled to take place on June 16, 2010, but was postponed, due to Bono's emergency back surgery.

On August 5, 2017, Green Day played a homecoming concert at the Coliseum. The show was part of the band's summer tour in support of their third number1 album, Revolution Radio.

The stadium hosted the "Bay Area" edition of large hip-hop music festival Rolling Loud in 2018 and '19. 2019 headliners included Future, G-Eazy, Migos, and Lil Uzi Vert.

The stadium holds the distinction of hosting the most concerts by The Grateful Dead with 66 shows between 1979 and 1995.

In popular culture
The music video for the Huey Lewis & the News song "Jacob's Ladder" was shot at a concert at the Coliseum on December 31, 1986.

Richard Marx shot the video for "Take This Heart" on the baseball field of the Coliseum.

The stadium was the location for the 1994 Disney movie Angels in the Outfield. Although Angel Stadium of Anaheim (known as Anaheim Stadium at the time) was where the Angels actually played, it was damaged in the 1994 Southern California earthquake. Anaheim Stadium was used for views from the outside and aerial views, while the Coliseum was used for interior shots.

The Coliseum was also used for scenes in the 2011 film Moneyball.

The climax of the novel There There by Tommy Orange takes place in the Coliseum.

Other events
The stadium has hosted an AMA Supercross Championship round since 2011.

The stadium has also hosted a Monster Jam event since 2008.

International soccer matches

Criticism

Baseball
In 2011, Bleacher Report named it the fifth-worst stadium in the majors, partly due to its expansive foul territory. In 2017 The New York Times called the Coliseum "a bland, charmless concrete monstrosity" that "isn't worthy of preservation... perhaps America's most hated sports stadium".

Two years later, in another Times article, writer Jack Nicas not only defended the Coliseum against criticism, he argued that its perceived failings were actually strengths. "The Coliseum is cheap, gritty and fun," he said. To his surprise, on moving to Oakland four years earlier, he had come to love the Coliseum as much as he had loved Fenway Park while growing up and while attending college in Boston, and Wrigley Field when he moved to Chicago after graduating college. If those parks were the baseball equivalent of classic pubs, Nicas wrote, "the Coliseum is baseball's last dive bar."

As a season ticket holder, Nicas got concessions at half price, leading to a combined cost of $7 for a hot dog and beer, a deal that he doubted could be matched anywhere else in the city. The Coliseum was also more spacious than Fenway or Wrigley, and while its expansive foul territory put fans at a distance it also allowed them more opportunities to see great catches by fielders. But while he found other A's fans who appreciated what the Coliseum had to offer and, like him, feared it would be lost in a new ballpark, he admitted those virtues had not drawn enough spectators to the Coliseum for the team to justify remaining there.

Public debt
A 1996 expansion of the stadium was funded by a controversial issuance—critics said that "(Oakland) Raiders' late owner, Al Davis, fleeced local officials at the expense of taxpayers"—of some $220 million of public debt by both Alameda County and the City of Oakland, resulting in substantial debt service payments for both governments. As of spring of 2018, the City of Oakland still owed $135 million for the expansion.

In December 2019, Alameda County officials announced the sale of the county's interest in the stadium to the Oakland A's baseball club, saying the $85 million deal would allow the county to pay off its share of the debt. In a joint statement, Supervisor Scott Haggerty and Supervisor Nate Miley noted that the two Supervisors "have led the negotiations and played instrumental roles in moving the sale of the county's share forward in the hope that, once finalized, the $85 million valuation will relieve the county of debt which has weighed on taxpayers for decades."

Mount Davis

One feature of the 1996 expansion was the addition of more than 10,000 seats in the upper deck that now spans the outfield in the baseball configuration, enclosing the stadium. Due to the stands' height and the loss of the Oakland hills view, A's fans have derisively nicknamed the structure "Mount Davis", after late Raiders owner Al Davis. It has been criticized as an area which has made the Oakland Coliseum look ever more like a football stadium, and not at all one for baseball. From 1997 to 2005, while the A's opened part of the upper deck for baseball, they did not count it as part of listed capacity; while the "official" capacity was 43,962, the "actual" capacity was 55,945.

In 2006, the Athletics covered the entire third deck with a tarp, reducing capacity to 34,077—the smallest capacity in MLB at the time. Even if a game was otherwise sold out, the A's would not sell any seats in the area. It would remain covered except if they made the World Series. The A's said that closing off the upper deck would create a "more intimate environment" for baseball. This drew criticism from fans, the Oakland City Council, and sports marketing analysts baffled at owner Lew Wolff's decision, with some stating that this was cover for a possible move to San Jose (see Cisco Field). There were 20,878 seats covered up by the tarp which would otherwise have been usable for baseball.

In February 2013, the Oakland Raiders announced that they would cover 11,000 seats in the Mount Davis section with a tarp; this reduced capacity to 53,250, making the coliseum by far the smallest in the NFL in seating capacity for its final years in the league (league rules required a minimum capacity of 50,000, and no other stadium, barring the temporary-used Dignity Health Sports Park, seated fewer than 61,000). This was done in order to potentially allow more Raiders games to be televised locally, as games are blacked out if less than 85% tickets are sold. Under NFL rules, the tarps had to stay in place all season long, even during the playoffs.

In 2017, new team President Dave Kaval decided to open several sections in the original third deck that were covered by tarps, though Mount Davis stayed tarped. This increased capacity by 12,103 to 47,170. The Athletics have since occasionally removed the tarp on Mount Davis for specific games, such as occasional Bay Bridge Series games against the San Francisco Giants, and the 2019 American League Wild Card Game against the Tampa Bay Rays. The latter set a record for attendance of a Wild Card Game, at 54,005.

Sewage
On June 16, 2013, following the game against the Seattle Mariners, the Coliseum experienced a severe sewage backup. After the game, the A's and Mariners were forced to share the Oakland Raiders locker room, located on the stadium's second floor. According to Coliseum officials, the stadium's aging plumbing system was overtaxed after a six-game homestand that drew close to baseball capacity crowds totaling 171,756 fans.

This was not the first time sewage problems cropped up at the stadium. On one occasion, the Los Angeles Angels complained about E. coli in the visiting team's training room after a backup. Backups occur even when no events are taking place there. For instance, Lew Wolff wanted to go to dinner on June 12, 2013 (while the A's were on the road) at one of the Coliseum's restaurants, only to discover that food service had been halted due to a sewage leak in the kitchen.

See also
Sports in the San Francisco Bay Area

References

External links

Official Oakland Coliseum website
County Coliseum_coliseum.htm Visit to Oakland–Alameda County Coliseum
History of Oakland–Alameda County Coliseum
Coliseum at MLB.com
FootballGeography.com: College football at the Oakland Coliseum
YouTube.com: Time-lapse video of the conversion between seating arrangement

Sports venues in Oakland, California
American football venues in California
Baseball venues in California
Multi-purpose stadiums in the United States
Major League Baseball venues
American Football League venues
Defunct National Football League venues
Oakland
Oakland Athletics stadiums
Oakland Clippers sports facilities
Oakland Invaders stadiums
Oakland Raiders stadiums
CONCACAF Gold Cup stadiums
Former Major League Soccer stadiums
North American Soccer League (1968–1984) stadiums
Soccer venues in California
United States Football League venues
1966 establishments in California
Sports venues completed in 1966
Skidmore, Owings & Merrill buildings